Fish and chips is a hot dish consisting of fried fish in batter, served with chips. The dish originated in England, where these two components had been introduced from separate immigrant cultures; it is not known who combined them. Often considered Britain's national dish, fish and chips is a common takeaway food in numerous other countries, particularly English-speaking and Commonwealth nations.

Fish and chip shops first appeared in the UK in the 1860s, and by 1910 there were over 25,000 across the UK. By the 1930s there were over 35,000 shops, but by 2009 there were only approximately 10,000. The British government safeguarded the supply of fish and chips during the First World War, and again in the Second World War. It was one of the few foods in the UK not subject to rationing during the wars.

History

The UK tradition of eating fish battered and fried in oil was introduced to the country by Spanish and Portuguese Jewish immigrants, who spent time in the Netherlands before settling in the UK as early as the 16th century. They prepared fried fish in a manner similar to pescado frito, which is coated in flour then fried in oil. Fish fried for Shabbat for dinner on Friday evenings could be eaten cold the following afternoon for shalosh seudot, palatable this way as liquid vegetable oil was used rather than a hard fat, such as butter. Charles Dickens mentions "fried fish warehouses" in Oliver Twist (1838), and in 1845 Alexis Soyer in his first edition of A Shilling Cookery for the People, gives a recipe for "fried fish, Jewish fashion", which is dipped in a batter mix of flour and water before frying. 

The location of the first fish and chip shop is unclear. The earliest known shops were opened in London during the 1860s by Eastern European Jewish immigrant Joseph Malin, and by John Lees in Mossley, Lancashire. However, fried fish and chips had existed separately for at least 50 years prior to this, so the possibility that they had been combined at an earlier time cannot be ruled out. Fish and chips became a stock meal among the working classes in England as a consequence of the rapid development of trawl fishing in the North Sea, and the development of railways which connected the ports to major industrial cities during the second half of the 19th century, so that fresh fish could be rapidly transported to the heavily populated areas.

Deep-fried chips (slices or pieces of potato) as a dish may have first appeared in England in about the same period: the Oxford English Dictionary notes as its earliest usage of "chips" in this sense the mention in Charles Dickens' A Tale of Two Cities (1859): "husky chips of potato, fried with some reluctant drops of oil".

The modern fish-and-chip shop ("chippy" in modern British slang) originated in the United Kingdom, although outlets selling fried food occurred commonly throughout Europe. Early fish-and-chip shops had only very basic facilities. Usually these consisted principally of a large cauldron of cooking fat, heated by a coal fire. The fish-and-chip shop later evolved into a fairly standard format, with the food served, in paper wrappings, to queuing customers, over a counter in front of the fryers. As a boy, Alfred Hitchcock lived above a fish and chip shop in London, which was the family business. According to Professor John Walton, author of Fish and Chips and the British Working Class, the British government made safeguarding supplies of fish and chips during the First World War a priority: "The cabinet knew it was vital to keep families on the home front in good heart, unlike the German regime that failed to keep its people well fed".

In 1928, Harry Ramsden opened his first fish and chip shop in Guiseley, West Yorkshire. On a single day in 1952, the shop served 10,000 portions of fish and chips, earning a place in the Guinness Book of Records. In George Orwell's The Road to Wigan Pier (1937), which documents his experience of working-class life in the North of England, the author considered fish and chips chief among the 'home comforts' which acted as a panacea to the working classes.

During the Second World War, fish and chips—a staple of the working class—remained one of the few foods in the United Kingdom not subject to rationing. Prime Minister Winston Churchill referred to the combination of fish and chips as "the good companions".

British fish and chips were originally served in a wrapping of old newspapers but this practice has now largely ceased, with plain paper, cardboard, or plastic being used instead. In the United Kingdom, the Fish Labelling Regulations 2003, and in the Republic of Ireland the European Communities (Labelling of Fishery and Aquaculture Products) Regulations 2003, respectively enact directive 2065/2001/EC, and generally mean that "fish" must be sold with the particular commercial name or species named; so, for example, "cod and chips" now appears on menus rather than the more vague "fish and chips". In the United Kingdom the Food Standards Agency guidance excludes caterers from this; but several local Trading Standards authorities and others do say it cannot be sold merely as "fish and chips".

United Kingdom

A prominent meal in British culture, fish and chips became popular in wider circles in London and South East England in the middle of the 19th century: Charles Dickens mentions a "fried fish warehouse" in Oliver Twist, first published in 1838, while in the north of England a trade in deep-fried chipped potatoes developed. It remains unclear exactly when and where these two trades combined to become the modern fish and chip shop industry. A Jewish immigrant, Joseph Malin, opened the first recorded combined fish-and-chip shop in Bow, East London, circa 1860; a Mr Lees pioneered the concept in the North of England, in Mossley, in 1863. A century later, the National Federation of Fish Friers, which made Malin's its first member, presented a plaque to Malin's as being the world's first fish and chip shop. A blue plaque is located at the other main contender for the first fish and chip shop, the present site of Oldham's Tommyfield Market. Located in Covent Garden, The Rock & Sole Plaice, dating from 1871, is London's oldest fish and chip shop still in operation. 

The concept of a sit-down fish restaurant—as opposed to takeaway—was introduced by Samuel Isaacs, an entrepreneur from Whitechapel, East London who ran a thriving wholesale and retail fish business. Dubbed the 'Fish Restaurant King', Isaacs' first restaurant opened in Lambeth, South London in 1896 serving fish and chips, bread and butter, and tea for nine pence. It became instantly popular and led to a chain which comprised 22 restaurants. Isaacs' trademark was the phrase "This is the Plaice", combined with a picture of the punned-upon fish in question, which appeared in all of his restaurants. Isaacs' restaurants were carpeted, had table service, tablecloths, flowers, china and cutlery, and made the trappings of upmarket dining affordable to the working classes. They were located in the Strand and other London locations, as well as Brighton, Ramsgate, Margate and other seaside resorts in southern England. Menus were expanded in the early 20th century to include meat dishes and other variations. A glimpse of the old Brighton restaurant at No.1 Marine Parade can be seen in the background of Norman Wisdom's 1955 film One Good Turn just as Pitkin runs onto the seafront; this is now the site of a Harry Ramsden's fish and chips restaurant. 

By 1910, there were over 25,000 fish and chip shops across the UK, a figure that grew to over 35,000 shops by the 1930s. Since then the trend has reversed, and in 2009 there were approximately 10,000 shops.

Scotland 
Dundee City Council claims that chips were first sold by a Belgian immigrant, Edward De Gernier, in the city's Greenmarket in the 1870s. In Edinburgh and the surrounding area, a combination of Gold Star brown sauce and water or malt vinegar, known as "sauce", or more specifically as "chippy sauce", has great popularity; salt and vinegar is preferred elsewhere in Scotland, often prompting light-hearted debate on the merits of each option by those who claim to find the alternative a baffling concept.

Fish & Chips Awards 
The annual National Fish & Chips Awards were set up in the UK in 1988. The 30th Annual Fish & Chips Awards ceremony was attended by Norwegian ambassador to the UK Mona Juul.

Australia

The first recorded owner of an Australian fish and chip shop is Greek migrant Athanasias Comino, who opened his shop in 1879 on Sydney's Oxford Street, though Comino's shop was inspired by an unknown Welshman's pre-existing fish and chip shop. In Australia today, there are an estimated 4000 fish and chip shops, as well as fish and chips being an essential menu offering in many Australian pubs and restaurants.

Canada

Fish and chips is a widely popular dish in Canada, sometimes using haddock or local lake-caught fish like perch or walleye. Most shops also sell poutine and other fried items. In the province of Newfoundland & Labrador, fish and chips made with cod fish are a staple food and the most common takeout meal.

Ireland

In Ireland, the first fish and chips were sold by an Italian immigrant, Giuseppe Cervi, who mistakenly stepped off a North America-bound ship at Queenstown (now Cobh) in County Cork in the 1880s and walked all the way to Dublin. He started by selling fish and chips outside Dublin pubs from a handcart. He then found a permanent spot in Great Brunswick Street (now Pearse Street). His wife Palma would ask customers "Uno di questa, uno di quella?" This phrase (meaning "one of this, one of that") entered the vernacular in Dublin as "one and one", which is still a way of referring to fish and chips in the city.

New Zealand

Fish and chips is the most popular takeaway food in New Zealand. Food historians have not been able to pinpoint exactly when the meal became an established part of New Zealand cuisine, but all recognise that the first fish and chips shops were introduced by British settlers before World War I. During the 20th century, nearly every small town and suburb in New Zealand had at least one fish-and-chip shop. As in Britain, Friday night has been the traditional night to eat fish.

Traditionally, fish and chips were served in wrappings of greaseproof paper and then newspaper as insulation. With the decline of the newspaper industry, this has become less common although plain, unprinted paper is still popular.

In 1980, four up-and-coming New Zealand Labour Party politicians, including David Lange, were nicknamed the "Fish and Chip Brigade" due to a picture published at the time with the group eating fish and chips.

United States

In the United States, the dish is most commonly sold as fish and chips, except in Upstate New York and Wisconsin and other parts of the Northeast and Upper Midwest, where this dish would be called a fish fry. While in the United States chips refers to potato chips ("crisps" in British English), the dish retains its native name. In the Southern United States, a common form of cuisine is fried catfish with french fries, accompanied by coleslaw, pickles, raw onion slices and lemon slices.

Other countries
The western Norwegian town of Kristiansund has had a tradition with fish and chips as street food since the 1940s. It is known locally as fishan.

Composition

Choice of fish
In Britain and Ireland, cod and haddock appear most commonly as the fish used for fish and chips, but vendors also sell many other kinds of fish, especially other white fish, such as pollock, hake or coley, plaice, skate, and ray (particularly popular in Ireland); and huss or rock salmon (a term covering several species of dogfish and similar fish). In traditional fish and chip shops several varieties of fish are offered by name ("haddock and chips"), but in some restaurants and stalls "fish and chips", unspecified, is offered; it is increasingly likely to be the much cheaper basa. In Northern Ireland, cod, plaice or whiting appear most commonly in 'fish suppers'—'supper' being Scottish and Northern Irish chip-shop terminology for a food item accompanied by chips. Suppliers in Devon and Cornwall often offer pollock and coley as cheap alternatives to haddock.

In Australia, reef cod and rock cod (a variety different from that used in the United Kingdom), barramundi or flathead (more expensive options), flake (a type of shark meat), King George whiting (little more expensive than other fish, but cheaper than barramundi or flathead) or snapper (cheaper options), are commonly used. From the early 21st century, farmed basa imported from Vietnam and hoki have become common in Australian fish and chip shops. Other types of fish are also used based on regional availability.

In New Zealand, snapper or gurnard was originally the preferred species for battered fillets in the North Island. As catches of this fish declined, it was replaced by hoki, shark (particularly rig) – marketed as lemon fish – and tarakihi. Bluefin gurnard and blue cod predominate in South Island fish and chips.

In the United States, the type of fish used depends on availability in a given region. Some common types are cod, halibut, flounder, tilapia or, in New England, Atlantic cod or haddock. Salmon is growing common on the West Coast, while freshwater catfish is most frequently used in the Southeast.

In India, the dish is usually based on pomfret fish and uses chilli paste, and more pepper than would be used in Britain.

In South Africa, hake and snoek are common choices.

Cooking

Traditional frying uses beef dripping or lard; however, vegetable oils, such as palm oil, rapeseed or peanut oil (used because of its relatively high smoke point)  predominate. A minority of vendors in the North of England and Scotland, and the majority of vendors in Northern Ireland, still use dripping or lard, as it imparts a different flavour to the dish, but this makes the fried chips unsuitable for vegetarians and for adherents of certain faiths. Lard is used in some living industrial history museums, such as the Black Country Living Museum. All of the fish is filleted and no bones should be found in the fish.

Batter
In Britain and Ireland, fish and chip shops traditionally use a simple water and flour batter, adding a little sodium bicarbonate (baking soda) and a little vinegar to create lightness, as they react to create bubbles in the batter. Other recipes may use beer or milk batter, where these liquids are often substitutes for water. The carbon dioxide in the beer lends a lighter texture to the batter. Beer also results in an orange-brown colour. A simple beer batter might consist of a 2:3 ratio of flour to beer by volume. The type of beer alters the taste of the batter; some prefer lager whereas others use stout or bitter.

Chips
British chips are usually considerably thicker than American-style french fries. Some U.S. restaurants and some people in their home cooking may use a thick type of chip, similar to the British variant, sometimes referred to as steak fries. In 2016, British chef Gordon Ramsay opened a British-themed fish-and-chip restaurant in the Las Vegas Strip.

Accompaniments

In chip shops in most parts of Britain and Ireland, salt and vinegar are traditionally sprinkled over fish and chips at the time it is served. Suppliers use malt vinegar, onion vinegar (used for pickling onions), or the cheaper non-brewed condiment. In a few places, notably Edinburgh, 'sauce' (as in 'salt and sauce') is more traditional than vinegar—with 'sauce' meaning a brown sauce. In England, a portion of mushy peas is a popular side dish, as are a range of pickles that typically include gherkins, onions and eggs. In table-service restaurants and pubs, the dish is usually served with a slice of lemon for squeezing over the fish and without any sauces or condiments, with salt, vinegar and sauces available at the customer's leisure. Ketchup is also a popular addition (a 2020 YouGov poll in the UK saw ketchup, curry sauce and mushy peas as the top three toppings after salt and vinegar). More than one in three in England use ketchup: John Lennon covered his fish and chips in ketchup.

In Ireland, Wales and England, many takeaways serve warm side portions of sauces such as curry sauce or gravy, if requested and normally for a small extra fee (curry sauce topped the poll in Wales with one in three using it as a topping). The sauces are usually poured over the chips. In the Midlands especially, chips with mushy peas or baked beans are known as a "pea mix" or a "bean mix". Other fried products include 'scraps' (also known as 'bits' in Southern England and "scrumps" in South Wales), originally a by-product of fish frying. Still popular in Northern England, they were given as treats to the children of customers. Portions prepared and sold today consist of loose blobs of batter, deep-fried to a crunchy golden crisp in the cooking fat. The potato scallop or potato cake consists of slices of potato dipped in fish batter and deep-fried until golden brown. These are often accompanied for dipping by the warm sauces listed above.

Nutrition information
An average serving of fish and chips consisting of 6 ounces (170 grams) of fried fish with 10 ounces (280 grams) of fried chips has approximately 1,000 calories and contains approximately 52 grams of fat. The use of tartar sauce as a condiment adds more calories and fat to the dish.

Vendors

In the United Kingdom, Republic of Ireland, Australia, Canada, New Zealand and South Africa, fish and chips are usually sold by independent restaurants and take-aways known as fish and chip shops. Outlets range from small affairs to chain restaurants. Locally owned seafood restaurants are also popular in many places, as are mobile "chip vans". In Canada, the outlets may be referred to as "chip wagons". In Ireland, the majority of traditional vendors are migrants or the descendants of migrants from southern Italy. A trade organisation exists to represent this tradition. In New Zealand and Australia, fish-and-chip vendors are a popular business and source of income among the Asian community, particularly Chinese migrants. In Indonesia, fish and chips are commonly found in western and seafood restaurants in large cities, as well as chain restaurants like The Manhattan Fish Market, Fish & Chips, etc.

Many British establishments have humorous or pun-based names, such as, "A Salt and Battery", "The Codfather", "The Frying Scotsman", "Oh My Cod", "Frying Nemo", "Rock and Sole" and "Jack the Chipper". The numerous competitions and awards for "best fish-and-chip shop" testify to the recognised status of this type of outlet in popular culture.

Fish and chips is a popular lunch meal eaten by families travelling to seaside resorts for day trips who do not bring their own picnic meals.

Fish-and-chip outlets sell roughly 25% of all the white fish consumed in the United Kingdom, and 10% of all potatoes.

Fish-and-chip shops traditionally wrapped their product in newspaper, or with an inner layer of white paper (for hygiene) and an outer layer of newspaper or blank newsprint (for insulation and to absorb grease), though the use of newspaper for wrapping has almost ceased on grounds of hygiene. , establishments usually use food-quality wrapping paper, or recyclable cardboard boxes.

The British National Federation of Fish Friers was founded in 1913. It promotes fish and chips and offers training courses. It has about 8,500 members from around the UK.

A previous world record for the "largest serving of fish and chips" was held by Gadaleto's Seafood Market in New Paltz, New York. This 2004 record was broken by Yorkshire pub Wensleydale Heifer in July 2011. An attempt to break this record was made by Doncaster fish and chip shop Scawsby Fisheries in August 2012, which served  of battered cod alongside  of chips.

Cultural impact

The long-standing Roman Catholic tradition of not eating meat on Fridays, especially during Lent, and of substituting fish for meat on that day continues to influence habits even in predominantly Protestant, semi-secular and secular societies. Friday night remains a traditional occasion for eating fish and chips; many cafeterias and similar establishments, while varying their menus on other days of the week, habitually offer fish and chips every Friday.

In 1967, inspired by the use of salt and vinegar as condiments for fish and chips in the UK, the Smiths Potato Crisps Company created Salt & Vinegar flavour crisps.

In Australia and New Zealand, the words "fish and chips" are often used as a shibboleth to highlight the difference in each country's short-i vowel sound . Australian English has a higher forward sound , close to the ee in see (but shorter), while New Zealand English has a lower backward sound  akin to the a in Rosa's (but not in Rosa, which is typically lower ). Thus, New Zealanders hear Australians say "feesh and cheeps," while Australians hear New Zealanders say "fush and chups."

Environment
In the UK, waste oil from fish and chip shops has become a useful source of biodiesel. The German biodiesel company Petrotec has outlined plans to produce biodiesel in the UK using waste oil from the British fish-and-chip industry.

See also

 Chicken and chips – another take-away dish often sold in the same establishments.
 Fried potatoes
 List of deep fried foods
 List of fish and chip restaurants
 List of fish dishes
 Pescado frito
 Kibbeling
 Moules-frites
 Scampi

References

Bibliography

External links

 "Top UK dish 'hooked French first'": BBC News: Fish and chips invented in France? Retrieved 2008-05-27
 "My plaice or yours?" - article from The Guardian detailing some chippy terminology. Retrieved 2008-05-27
 Far Flung Fish and Chips - historical article
 "Fish and chips": the (UK) Sea Fish Industry Authority's views. Retrieved 2008-05-27
 BBC TWO Ching He Huang-style fish and chips
 National Federation of Fish Friers, the UK industry body for fish and chip shops.

British cuisine
English cuisine
Irish cuisine
Norwegian cuisine
American cuisine
Canadian cuisine
Australian cuisine
New Zealand cuisine
South African cuisine
Indian cuisine
Fast food
Chips
Potato dishes
Deep fried foods
Food combinations
National dishes
British seafood dishes